Chaetostoma dermorhynchum is a species of catfish in the family Loricariidae. It is native to South America, where it occurs in the basins of the Pastaza River, the Bobonaza River, the Napo River, and the Curaray River in Ecuador. The species reaches 25 cm (9.8 inches) in total length.

References 

dermorhynchum

Fish described in 1887
Catfish of South America
Fish of Ecuador